ROKS Bi Ro Bong (LST-682) is a  in the Republic of Korea Navy.

Construction and commissioning 
The ship was launched in 1995 by Hanjin Heavy Industries at Busan and commissioned into the Navy in 1998.

References

Ships built by Hanjin Heavy Industries
Go Jun Bong-class tank landing ships
1995 ships